Guilford J. Langford (1862 – February 25, 1917) was an American politician in the state of Washington. He served in the Washington House of Representatives. He was elected as a Progressive in 1912, alongside A. J. Gillbo. He died in 1917 after a long illness.

References

Members of the Washington House of Representatives
1862 births
1917 deaths
19th-century American politicians